Bernard Butler (1 September 1886 – 13 March 1959) was an Irish Fianna Fáil politician and school teacher. He spoke four languages specifically Irish, English, French and German. He lived in Terenure, with his wife Peggy. He was elected to Dáil Éireann as a Fianna Fáil Teachta Dála (TD) for the Dublin Townships constituency at the 1943 general election. 

He was re-elected at every subsequent general election up to 1957. He died in office in 1959 during the 16th Dáil, a by-election was held on 22 July 1959 which was won by Richie Ryan of Fine Gael. He served as Lord Mayor of Dublin from 1953 to 1954. He also served as governor of the Royal Irish Academy of Music.

References

1886 births
1959 deaths
Fianna Fáil TDs
Members of the 11th Dáil
Members of the 12th Dáil
Members of the 13th Dáil
Members of the 14th Dáil
Members of the 15th Dáil
Members of the 16th Dáil
Lord Mayors of Dublin
Irish schoolteachers